The London Borough of Hackney is a London borough in Inner London. The borough is named after Hackney, its principal district. Southern and eastern parts of the borough are popularly regarded as being part of east London, with the northwest belonging to north London. Its population is 281,120 inhabitants.

The London Plan issued by the Greater London Authority assigns whole boroughs to sub-regions for statutory monitoring, engagement and resource allocation purposes. The most recent (2011) iteration of this plan assigns Hackney to the ‘East’ sub-region, while the 2008 and 2004 versions assigned the borough to "North" and "East" sub-regions respectively. The modern borough was formed in 1965 by the merger of the Metropolitan Borough of Hackney with the much smaller Metropolitan Boroughs of Stoke Newington and Shoreditch.

Hackney is bounded by Islington to the west, Haringey to the north, Waltham Forest to the north-east, Newham to the east, Tower Hamlets to the south-east and the City of London to the south-west. Hackney was one of the host boroughs of the London Olympics in 2012, with several of the Queen Elizabeth Olympic Park venues falling within its boundaries.

History

Place name origin
In the 13th century the name appears as Hackenaye or Hacquenye, but no certain derivation is advanced. The Concise Oxford Dictionary of Place Names (fourth edition) discusses the origin of the name. The first surviving records of the place name are as Hakney (1231) and Hakeneye (1242 and 1294). The "ey" suffix almost certainly refers to an island; the dictionary favours the interpretation that Hackney means "Haka's island", with Haka being a notable local person and the island (or inaccessible place surrounded by marshes) lying close to the River Lea. This was once a much wilder place than today.

The dictionary suggests that the Hack element may also derive from:
 The Old English "Haecc", meaning a hatch – an entrance to a woodland or common.
 Or alternatively from "Haca", meaning a hook, and in this context, a bend of the river.
Given the island context, the "hatch" option is unlikely to be correct, so the favoured "Haka's Island" or the "Island on the bend" seem more likely.

The place name will have originally referred to just the island or possibly both the island and the manor of the same name based around it. Subsequently, the name Hackney was applied to the whole ancient parish of Hackney.

Iron Age to Anglo-Saxon period
In the Iron Age and probably until after the Roman period (as the Romans used tribal territories as administrative sub-divisions), the River Lea was considered to separate the territories of the Catuvellauni to the west of the river from the Trinovantes to the east.

The Romans built the Roman road, Ermine Street, which runs through the modern borough under the names Shoreditch High Street and Kingsland Road, among others.

In the Anglo-Saxon period, the River Lea separated the core territories of the East Saxons (on the east side) from the Middle Saxons (on the western, Hackney side) they often controlled. This continuity of this natural boundary from pre-Roman period may be a result of the differing Saxon groups taking control of pre-defined territories.

After both areas were brought under the control of Alfred the Great, the river became the boundary between the historic counties of Middlesex (Hackney) and Essex (modern Newham, Waltham Forest and Redbridge).

Later history

In the Tudor period, the lands of religious orders were seized by the Crown and put up for sale. Thus Hackney became a retreat for the nobility around Hackney Central and Homerton. Henry VIII's Palace was by Lea Bridge roundabout, where BSix Sixth Form College stands today. Sutton House, on Homerton High Street, is the oldest surviving dwelling in Hackney, originally built in 1535 as Bryck Place for Sir Ralph Sadleir, a diplomat. The village of Hackney flourished from the Tudor to late Georgian periods as a rural retreat.

The first documented "hackney coach"—the forerunner of the more generic "hackney carriage"—operated in London in 1621. Current opinion is that the name "hackney", to refer to a London taxi, is derived from the village name. (Hackney, associated with high-stepping horses and horse-drawn carriages, is the root of the French word haquenée, a term used for a small breed of horse, and the Sardinian  horse.) Construction of the railway in the 1850s ended Hackney's rural reputation by connecting it to other parts of the city and stimulating development.

London's first Tudor theatres were built at Shoreditch. The Gunpowder Plot was first exposed nearby in Hoxton.

In 1727 Daniel Defoe said of the villages of Hackney 

The parish church of St John-at-Hackney was built in 1789, replacing the nearby former 16th-century parish church dedicated to St Augustine (pulled down in 1798).

Notable residents from the 17th, 18th and 19th centuries included Robert Aske, William Cecil, Samuel Courtauld, Samuel Hoare, Joseph Priestley and Thomas Sutton.

Many grand houses stood in Stoke Newington and Stamford Hill; the latter neighbourhood became a center of Hackney's many Orthodox Jewish residents from the 1930s. Alfred Hitchcock made many of his first films in Hoxton at the Gainsborough Studios in Poole Street.

The interwar era saw the building of social housing by the LCC and the borough council in the area including the Kingsmead Estate, Morningside Estate, Banister House and Nisbet House. The borough also includes housing projects developed by high-profile postwar architects including The Beckers (1958) by Sir Frederick Gibberd, Granard House (1959) by Colin St John Wilson and Pitcairn House (1962) by Eric Lyons. Following extensive post-war development and immigration since the late 20th century, population pressure has increased and the area's many Georgian and Victorian terraces are being gentrified, warehouses are being converted to housing, and new flats are being built. 

In the 1980s and beyond, Hackney was described as the poorest borough in Britain - although it has been questioned whether this may have in fact been Glasgow, at the time. The council used the phrase 'Britain's Poorest Borough' in official materials. It was described in this way as late as 2001 and in Parliament in 2010. This picture has now changed: the 2019 Indices of Multiple Deprivation found that Hackney was the 22nd most deprived borough in England, down from 11th in 2015 and 2nd in 2010, whilst Hackney has also featured prominently in discussions of gentrification. 

It was ranked as inner London's "greenest borough" and London Transport's "best bike borough 2006", with 62 parks and open spaces, covering . Seven Hackney parks have now achieved Green Flag status. One, Abney Park, became scheduled in 2009 as one of Britain's historic parks and garden at risk from neglect and decay. Hackney Marshes play host to the largest collection of football pitches in Europe. Part of it was used as a site for events of the 2012 Summer Olympics.

Listed buildings and conservation areas
There are 1,300 listed buildings in Hackney, including the Hackney Empire, Tudor Sutton House, and the Grade I medieval St Augustine's Tower, the borough's oldest building. The borough contains 25 conservation areas including Clapton Square and urban open-spaces including Clapton Common and Clissold Park. Conservation areas also protect large areas of Georgian and Victorian housing, and areas of industrial heritage.

Governance

Representation

The Borough is currently divided into 21 wards, which between them return 57 councillors. Fifteen of the wards return three councillors and the remaining six return two each, in a first past the post system of elections. Ward boundaries are regularly revised, with the last review being in 2014. Until the 2002 revision, the historic boundaries of Hackney and Stoke Newington were retained as a basis for the sub-division of the borough into wards, though the boundary between Hackney and Shoreditch was not re-used to the same degree.

Unlike most other English local authorities, the borough is now governed by a directly elected mayor who is also the political leader of the council. The mayor – currently Philip Glanville – is supported by a cabinet, councillors and a speaker who fulfils the civic and ceremonial duties previously undertaken by the (non-political) mayor.

The borough comprises two parliamentary constituencies: Hackney North and Stoke Newington (represented by Diane Abbott MP) and Hackney South and Shoreditch (represented by Meg Hillier MP); both are Privy Counsellors and Labour Party Members of Parliament. The borough is in the North East London Assembly constituency returning Sem Moema AM as the directly elected Assembly Member.

Administrative Heritage

The constituent parts of the borough are Hackney, Shoreditch and Stoke Newington. Originally Ancient Parishes, these areas have had consistent boundaries since the mediaeval period. 
 
Parishes in Middlesex were grouped into "Divisions", with Stoke Newington part of the Finsbury division and Hackney and Shoreditch part of the Tower division. The Tower Division was noteworthy in that the men of the area owed military service to the Tower of London.
 
The Ancient Parishes provided a framework for both civil (administrative) and ecclesiastical (church) functions, but during the nineteenth century there was a divergence into distinct civil and ecclesiastical parish systems. In London the Ecclesiastical Parishes sub-divided to better serve the needs of a growing population, while the Civil Parishes continued to be based on the same Ancient Parish areas.

The Metropolis Management Act 1855 merged the Civil Parishes of Hackney and Stoke Newington under a new Hackney District. This proved very unpopular, especially in more affluent Stoke Newington and after four unsuccessful attempts the two parishes regained their independence when they were separated by mutual consent under the Metropolis Management (Plumstead and Hackney) Act of 1893.
 
The London Government Act 1899 converted the three Civil Parishes into Metropolitan Boroughs based on the same boundaries. There were minor rationalisations, notably that Shoreditch absorbed part of the tiny Liberty of Norton Folgate (with the rest going to neighbouring Stepney), while Stoke Newington absorbed the South Hornsey exclaves of Hornsey.

Stoke Newington was smaller than the desired size for the new boroughs, and there were proposals to re-merge Stoke Newington and Hackney, or to detach the northern part of Hackney and join it with Stoke Newington. These proposals were rejected due to the experience of "intolerable and interminable feuds" between the districts when they were previously "forced together", and because the First Lord of the Treasury, Arthur Balfour recognised that there was "great ill-feeling and mutual ill-will... between the inhabitants of the two districts"; it was therefore decided to merge the bulk of South Hornsey, with a population about 20,000, with Stoke Newington. While this still created a borough of only about 50,000 inhabitants, and thus "the smallest borough in London, the anomaly would be a gradually diminishing one, because the population in this district was rapidly increasing. When dividing London up into boroughs they could not avoid creating some anomalies as to size."

In 1965 the three old boroughs were merged into the new London Borough of Hackney, which adopted a coat of arms that included elements representing its predecessors:

 The shield is surmounted by a representation of Hackney's St. Augustine's Tower.
 An eight-pointed Maltese Cross, for Hackney, which derives from the symbols of the Orders of the Knights Templar and Knights of St. John, both of whom held the Manor of Hackney.
 Bells representing Shoreditch, these are the bells in the nursery rhyme Oranges and Lemons.
 Oaks for Stoke Newington, representing its origins in the Forest of Middlesex.

The council displays, in Hackney Town Hall, a portrait of the Queen wearing the robes of the Most Venerable Order of St John of Jerusalem, of which she is Patron.

Geography

Neighbourhoods

The borough was formed by the merger of the metropolitan boroughs of Hackney, Shoreditch and Stoke Newington, with the boundaries of these very closely based on the Ancient Parishes of the same name; these areas have been consistently defined for many centuries. Historically, the River Lea formed the boundary between the predecessor counties of Middlesex and Essex.

Within these parish areas are a large number of sub-districts, some of which have sub-districts of their own. These sub-districts are generally based on former hamlets that expanded and merged as the area urbanised. These sub-districts have never been administrative units so have never had any formal boundaries, however a degree of informal definition has developed.
 
The sub-districts typically take Metropolitan Borough\Ancient Parish boundaries where available, and can also have informal customary boundaries such as road and railways. Despite this, many areas have only a weakly or partially understood extent and it is not unusual for perceptions of place to overlap or change over time.

The area of the former parish and borough of Stoke Newington includes the Woodberry Down area, while the former parish and borough of Shoreditch includes Hoxton and Haggerston.

The former parish and borough of Hackney is much larger and includes Hackney Central, Hackney Downs, West Hackney, Dalston, De Beauvoir Town, Shacklewell, Stamford Hill, London Fields, Upper and Lower Clapton, Hackney Wick and Homerton.

Topography and Landscape history
The London Borough of Hackney covers an area of 19.06 square kilometres (7.4 sq mi), rising westward from the Lea to reach 30 metres (98 ft) above sea level at Clapton Common and Stamford Hill. The area around Victoria Park, in the south of the borough lies about 15 metres (49 ft) above sea level.

After the Norman Conquest the area became part of the Forest of Middlesex, which covered much of the county, but this gives rise to misunderstanding, as in this context "Forest" is a legal term referring to royal hunting rights and had a weak correlation with woodland cover, especially in the early post-Conquest Period.

By the time of the earliest reliable maps, in the 18th century, the area covered by the modern borough was an agricultural area characterised by enclosed farmland with small hamlets and very little woodland. There were a number of commons, most of which survived to become the basis of modern parks. Many of the major roads were present by this time, the road now known as the A10 was Roman, and others, like many in England, may be older.

With the obvious exception of the urbanisation of the area, the greatest changes have been to the waterways and wetlands of the area. The River Lea, the area's primary geographic feature, has lost its grazing marshes and seen the River Lee Navigation created in 1770. This is an artificial channel of the river, passing through Hackney Cut and across the Hackney Marshes to straighten a meander of the natural river. In Roman times and for a long time after, the River Lea was an estuary, tidal as far as Hackney Wick.

At Hackney Wick the Hackney Brook met the Lea; the confluence was very wide when flooded. Hackney Brook was fully culverted in 1860 by the Metropolitan Board of Works.

The New River was opened in 1613, diverting water from the Lea catchment to create a source of drinking water for London. The New River still passes through the borough, close to Finsbury Park and flows towards Islington. Another man-made feature, the Regents Canal also crosses the borough to the south of De Beauvoir Town in the west, joining the Hertford Union Canal below Victoria Park.

Housing and industry
Much of Hackney retains an inner-city character, but in such places as Dalston large housing estates have been joined by newly developed gated communities. In South Hackney, near Victoria Park, terraced Georgian, Victorian and Edwardian housing still survives.

Light industries in the area around the River Lea employ over 3,000 people.

Geology
The Lea and Hackney Marshes are underlain by alluvium soils; and the higher ground between Homerton and Stamford Hill is formed on a widening bed of London Clay. Brickearth deposits are within tongues of clay extending beneath Clapton Common, Stamford Hill and Stoke Newington High Street. The centre and south-western districts lie on river terrace deposits of Taplow Gravel. Victoria Park and Well Street Common lie on flood plain gravel.

Climate

Demography 

In 1801, the civil parishes that form the modern borough had a total population of 14,609. This rose steadily throughout the 19th century, as the district became built up; reaching 95,000 in the middle of that century. When the railways arrived the rate of population growth increased — reaching nearly 374,000 by the turn of the century. This increase in population peaked before World War I, falling slowly in the aftermath until World War II began an exodus from London towards the new towns under the Abercrombie Plan for London (1944). The population is now rising again, and the 2001 census gives Hackney a population of 202,824.

The population is ethnically diverse. Of the resident population, 89,490 (44%) people describe themselves as White British. 24,861 (12%) are in other White ethnic groups, 50,009 (24%) are Black or Black British, 19,791 (9%) are Asian or Asian British, 8,501 (4%) describe themselves as 'Mixed', and 6,432 (3%) as Chinese or Other.

There is also a large Turkish and Kurdish population resident in Hackney. Turkish and Kurdish communities are located in all parts of the borough, though there is a greater concentration in north and central Hackney.

132,931 (66%) of the resident population were British born. A further 10,095 (5%) were born in other parts of Europe, and the remaining 59,798 (29%) born elsewhere in the world.

2018 estimates are that Christianity is the biggest religion in Hackney, with 31% of residents identifying Christian; 13% identified as Muslim, 10% Jewish, and 7% belonged to other religions. A further 38% either have no religion, or did not submit a response. In numerical terms, Hackney has the second largest Jewish population of any local authority in the United Kingdom, after the London Borough of Barnet (and in percentage terms, third after Barnet and the Hertsmere borough of Hertfordshire).

32% of households are owner–occupied.

The largest rise of ethnic groups between 2001 and 2011 was "Other", which increased by 222%. This was followed by "Mixed", which rose by 84%.

According to the GLA Population Estimate for 2018, 36.4% of the borough's population are White British, 18.1% are "Other White", 10.3% are of Black African heritage, and 6.4% are of Black Caribbean heritage. Hackney is also home to several smaller Asian communities.

Ethnicity

Religion

The following shows the religious identity of residents residing in Hackney according to the census results.

Other statistics
In a 2007 report, every ward of Hackney was among the 10% most deprived in the country, with 47% of children living in low-income households.

Hackney had a reputation as one of the most crime-ridden London boroughs, and some of its streets have even been referred to as "Murder Mile", but cooperation between local police and council has resulted in the borough experiencing a bigger drop in crime than in any other London borough in the four-year period up to 2007 (28% reduction).

In the 2011 census, Hackney had the highest rate of commuters travelling by bicycle in London.

Education

In 2002, the borough entered into a 10-year contract with the Learning Trust, an independent collaborative body that organises education for Hackney's 27,000 pupils in over 70 schools, nurseries and play centres. The trust was set up in response to an OFSTED report that identified failings in the then existing system. Two of London's most successful City Academies are in Hackney with another two in development and plans to rebuild or renovate every other Hackney school by 2016.
LBH regained responsibility for education in 2012, absorbing the Learning Trust under the new name "Hackney Learning Trust".

Public libraries 
The London Borough of Hackney has eight public libraries:

 Clapton Library
 Dalston CLR James Library
 Hackney Central Library
 Homerton Library
 Shoreditch Library
 Stamford Hill Library
 Stoke Newington Library
 Woodberry Down Library

Transport
Hackney has only one London Underground station, on the fringe of the borough. Manor House on the Piccadilly Line is located on its extreme north-western fringe on the boundary with Haringey.

However, three London Overground lines serve Hackney: the North London Line crosses from west to east while the East London Line runs from Highbury & Islington and passes through Dalston Junction and on south through Haggerston, Hoxton, Shoreditch towards destinations south of the River Thames, including Clapham Junction, Crystal Palace, Croydon, and New Cross. Local services on the Lea Valley Lines passed into London Overground on 31 May 2015. Trains originate at London Liverpool Street and head towards either Enfield Town (via Bush Hill Park), Cheshunt (via Turkey Street) or Chingford (via Clapton).

It is proposed that Crossrail 2 will provide Hackney a new station at Dalston with the potential of the future ‘eastern branch’ with stops at Hackney Central and Hackney Wick.

London Overground
North London Line Travelling west to east —  Dalston Kingsland, Hackney Central, Homerton and Hackney Wick

East London Line Travelling north to south — Dalston Junction, Haggerston, Hoxton and Shoreditch High Street

Lea Valley Lines Travelling south to north – London Fields, Hackney Downs, Rectory Road, Stoke Newington and Stamford Hill.

Travel to work
In March 2011, the main forms of transport that residents used to travel to work were: bus, minibus or coach, 16.9% of all residents aged 16–74; underground, metro, light rail, tram, 9.2%; bicycle, 9.2%; on foot, 7.5%; driving a car or van, 7.1%; train, 4.6%; work mainly at or from home, 3.5%.

65% of households in Hackney are car free.

Media
The Hackney Gazette provides local news.

Notable people

Attractions and institutions

 Abney Park Cemetery – overgrown Victorian cemetery and Nature Reserve
 Arcola Theatre – studio theatre
Broadway Market – popular outdoor market
Cafe Oto – new music club and daytime café
The Dolphin - Grade II listed public house and venue
 Geffrye Museum – decorative arts museum
 Happy Man Tree - England's Tree of the Year 2020
 Hackney Empire – theatre
Hackney City Farm
 Hackney Carnival – carnival street parade
 Hackney Wick Stadium (closed 1997)
 Hoxton Hall – community centre and performance space
National Centre of Circus Arts – circus school
 Newington Green Unitarian Church – London's oldest nonconformist place of worship
Rio Cinema – A Grade II listed independent Art Deco cinema 
 St John's Hoxton – Anglican church (where "Amazing Grace" was written)
 Shoreditch Town Hall
 Sutton House – Heritage house and museum
 The Towers of Hackney
 Victoria Miro Gallery – contemporary art gallery
 Vortex Jazz Club – live jazz venue
 Woodberry Wetlands – Nature Reserve
St Leonard's Hospital, Hackney - Local Hospital

Twin towns – sister cities
Hackney is twinned with:
 Austin, United States
 Haifa, Israel
 St. George's, Grenada
 Suresnes, France

Hackney was formerly also twinned with Göttingen in Germany, Presnensky District in Russia, and Alexandra in South Africa, but this links are not active anymore.

Freedom of the Borough
The following people, military units, and organisations and groups have received the Freedom of the Borough of Hackney.

Individuals
 Alderman The Reverend John Hillman: 1928.
 Alderman Theodore Chapman : 1931.
 Councillor Henry Charles Rawll 1931.
 Sir William Ray Knight : 1931.
 Captain Sir Oscar Warburg : 1931.
 Councillor Walter Ernest Loweth : 1934.
 Alderman Henry Edwin Goodrich : 1941.
 Councillor Giles Charles Burton : 1947.
 Herbert William Butler : 1947.
 Alderman Mrs. Florence Helena Du Vergier : 1947.
 Councillor Walter Thomas Wayman : 1947.
 Alderman Albert Cullington: 1955.
 The Honourable Arthur George Child-Villiers : 1955.
 Monsieur Marcel Legras, Mayor of Suresnes Seine: 1958.
 William Nichols : 1960.
 Councillor Mrs. Clarissa Gooch : 1960.
 Mrs. Mary Omerod : 1964.
 Charles Richard Halerow: 1964.
 Councillor George Ernest Silver : 1964.
 George Leonard Alfred Downing : 1965.
 Ernest Henderson: 1965.
 Alderman Sir Louis Sherman : 1978.
 Alderman Lady Sherman : 1978.
 Councillor Mrs. Gladys M. Shanagher: 1978.
 Councillor Miss Lilian Karpin: 1978.
 Councillor Arthur Super: 1978.
 Councillor Alfred Alexander: 1978.
 Councillor Max Marcus Feldman: 1986.
 Councillor John Kotz: 1986.
 Councillor Robert William Masters: 1986.
 Edward George Henry Millen: 1986.
 Martin Ottolangui: 1986.
 Councillor Robert Edward Owen: 1986.
 Matilda Anne Owen: 1990.
 Dr. Alexander Englehardt: 1995.
 Councillor Joe Lobenstein : 1997.
 Councillor Gerry Ross: 1997.
 Gordon Bell: 19 April 2001.
 Councillor Saleem Siddiqui: 30 October 2013.
 Lieutenant Colonel Roderick Morriss : 25 February 2015.

Military units
 3 Military Intelligence Battalion (Volunteers) Intelligence Corps: 2008.

Organisations and groups
 Volunteer Centre Hackney: 21 July 2021.
Medics at the Homerton University Hospital: 28 July 2021.

References

External links 

 Council website

 
Hackney
1965 establishments in the United Kingdom